Dewi Remaja is a beauty pageant and reality television show in which a number of aspiring Malaysian women compete for the title of "Dewi Remaja" and the opportunity to start a career in the modelling or acting industry based in Malaysia. Created and organized by the Remaja magazine owned by the Kumpulan Media Karangkraf Sdn. Bhd (now known as Nu Ideaktif Sdn. Bhd) while Astro television is the main broadcaster of the contest. Since its establishment in 1985, the pageant have crowned 11 winners. The winner is crowned by the previous edition's titleholder.

The reigning Dewi Remaja is Murut-Dusun Tracie Sinidol from Tambunan, Sabah. She was crowned on 3 September 2022. She was the first Sabahan and the first woman from East Malaysia to ever win the title of Dewi Remaja.

History 
During the 2018 edition of Dewi Remaja, the winner Haneesya Hanee was stripped off her title due to a controversial video of her with other friends at a nightclub. However, she was not replaced by any of the runners-up. For the first time in the history of Dewi Remaja, the Remaja magazine did not feature a winning image of the winner on the cover page.

Format 
Each edition of Dewi Remaja has eight episodes and starts with 10 to 12 contestants. Contestants are judged weekly based on their overall appearance and participation in challenges. In some editions, every contestants get the chance to be appear on the cover page of Remaja magazine; each episode, one contestant is eliminated, whereas in exceptional situations, the panel of judges did not comply on an elimination.

Selection of participants 
Started from 2019, the talent search, which was jointly organized by Remaja magazine, one of the brands under Nu Ideaktiv (formerly known as Karangkraf Group), explicitly states that each participant need to go through the category of "General Knowledge" as one of the participants' scoring criteria in order to increase the variety of participants. Judging panelists Scha Al-Yahya (former Dewi Remaja) and Yusry Abdul Halim will be judging 30 percent of the marks for personality, 35 percent for talent, and 35 percent for overall performance which includes the general knowledge.

Following that, a total of top 20 quarter-finalists were chosen for the final screening, with only 12 being chosen as semi-finalists.

Titleholders

Gallery of winners

List of Runners-up

Editions

Dewi Remaja 2019 
For the 11th edition, 600 contestants from all across Malaysia were auditioned for the competition before top 20 quarter-finalists were selected. Top 12 semi-finalists were announced during the press conference on 15 October 2019 held at The Starling Mall, Damansara Utama. They were quarantined for 54 days to minimize any social problems as seen during the previous edition.

The competition was aired over the course of eight episodes on Astro Ria and Astro Ria HD, whereby contestants were eliminated. The top five finalists then competed in a grand finale held on 14 December 2019 and was telecast live. At the end of the pageant, Shaza Nuriman Mohamad Zamri of Kuala Lumpur won the title of Dewi Remaja 2019.

Notable alumni
Among the names of celebrities who have been born through this competition is Mawar Rashid, Puteri Aishah, Neelofa, Izara Aishah, Anzalna Nasir, Scha Al-Yahya, Izreen Azminda, Annahita Bakavoli, Juliana Banos, Rita Rudaini, Wardina Safiyyah, Julia Hana, Pushpa Narayan, Rozita Che Wan, Aleeza Kassim, Jasmin Hamid, Umie Aida, singer Sheril Aida, Rehana Yasin and many others.

Notes

References

External links
 Official website

Beauty pageants in Malaysia